Murray Buswell (born 1962), is a male former swimmer who competed for Great Britain and England.

Swimming career
Buswell became National champion in 1984 when he won the 1984 ASA National Championship title in the 200 metres breaststroke.

Buswell represented England in the 200 metres breaststroke event, at the 1986 Commonwealth Games in Edinburgh, Scotland. He also represented Great Britain at the 1985 European Aquatics Championships.

References

1962 births
English male swimmers
Swimmers at the 1986 Commonwealth Games
Living people
Commonwealth Games competitors for England